PC4 and SFRS1 interacting protein 1, also known as lens epithelium-derived growth factor (LEDGF/p75), dense fine speckles 70kD protein (DFS 70) or transcriptional coactivator p75/p52, is a protein that in humans is encoded by the PSIP1 gene.

Function 

PSIP1 has not been clearly linked to a specific cellular mechanism.  The term LEDGF/p75 (Lens epithelium-derived growth factor) has entered common usage based on the initial characterization of PSIP1, however this is a misnomer, as the protein is present in most tissues and has no direct role in the development of lens epithelium. LEDGF/p75, a transcription coactivator, gained prominence as a host factor that assists HIV integration and is probably the only integrase interactor whose knock-down severely affects the HIV integration levels. The interaction between HIV integrase and human LEDGF/p75 is a promising target for anti-HIV drug discovery. LEDGF/p75 recruits MLL complexes to HOX genes to regulate their expression. LEDGF/p52 is shown to recruit splicing factors to H3K36 trimethylated chromatin to modulate alternative splicing, also regulates HOTTIP lncRNA, which is shown to regulate HOX genes in cis.

Structure 

LEDGF/p75 is a 60kDa, 530-amino-acid-long protein.  The N-terminal portion of the protein consists of a PWWP domain, a nuclear localization sequence, and two copies of the AT-hook DNA binding motif.  The C-terminal portion of LEDGF/p75 contains a structure termed the integrase-binding domain, which interacts with lentiviral integrase proteins as well as numerous cellular proteins.  The N-terminal portion interacts strongly with chromatin, making LEDGF/p75 a constitutively nuclear protein.  An isoform of the protein, LEDGF/p52, is produced by alternative splicing.  LEDGF/p52 shares the N-terminal 325 amino acids of LEDGF/p75 but lacks the integrase-binding domain.

Interactions 

PSIP1 has been shown to interact with the proteins ASF/SF2, JPO2, Cdc7-Dbf4, and POGZ as well as the menin/MLL protein complex.

References

Further reading